Blasticidin may refer to:

 Blasticidin A
 Blasticidin S

See also
 Blasticidin-S deaminase